The 1996 Pakistan Masters was an invitational non-ranking snooker tournament held in Pakistan in 1996. Noppadon Noppachorn won the tournament defeating Brian Morgan 7–5 in the final.

Results

{{16TeamBracket
| RD1=Last 16Best of 7 frames
| RD2=Quarter-finalsBest of 9 frames
| RD3=Semi-finalsBest of 11 frames
| RD4=FinalBest of 13 frames
| RD1-seed01 = 
| RD1-team01 = {{nowrap| Noppadon Noppachorn}}
| RD1-score01 = 4
| RD1-seed02 = 
| RD1-team02 =  Shokat Ali
| RD1-score02 = 0
| RD1-seed03 = 
| RD1-team03 =  Steve Lemmens
| RD1-score03 = 4
| RD1-seed04 = 
| RD1-team04 =  Muhammad Yousaf
| RD1-score04 = 0
| RD1-seed05 =
| RD1-team05 =  Fergal O'Brien
| RD1-score05 = 4
| RD1-seed06 = 
| RD1-team06 =  Sammy Chong
| RD1-score06 = 0
| RD1-seed07 = 
| RD1-team07 =  Gary Ponting
| RD1-score07 = 4
| RD1-seed08 = 
| RD1-team08 =  Saleh Mohammad
| RD1-score08 = 1
| RD1-seed09 =
| RD1-team09 =  Brian Morgan
| RD1-score09 = 4
| RD1-seed10 = 
| RD1-team10 =  Aneel Bherwani
| RD1-score10 = 0
| RD1-seed11 = 
| RD1-team11 =  Marcus Campbell
| RD1-score11 = 4
| RD1-seed12 = 
| RD1-team12 =  Phaitoon Phonbun
| RD1-score12 = 2
| RD1-seed13 = 
| RD1-team13 =  Guo Hua
| RD1-score13 = 4
| RD1-seed14 = 
| RD1-team14 =  Firhan Mirza
| RD1-score14 = 0
| RD1-seed15 = 
| RD1-team15 =  Tai Pichit
| RD1-score15 = 4
| RD1-seed16 = 
| RD1-team16 =  Suriya Suwannasingh
| RD1-score16 = 1

| RD2-seed01 = 
| RD2-team01 = {{nowrap| Noppadon Noppachorn}}
| RD2-score01 = 5
| RD2-seed02 = 
| RD2-team02 =  Steve Lemmens
| RD2-score02 = 3
| RD2-seed03 = 
| RD2-team03 =  Fergal O'Brien
| RD2-score03 = 5
| RD2-seed04 = 
| RD2-team04 =  Gary Ponting
| RD2-score04 = 2
| RD2-seed05 = 
| RD2-team05 =  Brian Morgan
| RD2-score05 = 5
| RD2-seed06 = 
| RD2-team06 =  Marcus Campbell
| RD2-score06 = 2
| RD2-seed07 = 
| RD2-team07 =  Guo Hua
| RD2-score07 = 5
| RD2-seed08 = 
| RD2-team08 =  Tai Pichit
| RD2-score08 = 1

| RD3-seed01 = 
| RD3-team01 = {{nowrap| Noppadon Noppachorn}}
| RD3-score01 = 6
| RD3-seed02 = 
| RD3-team02 =  Fergal O'Brien
| RD3-score02 = 3
| RD3-seed03 = 
| RD3-team03 =  Brian Morgan
| RD3-score03 = 6
| RD3-seed04 =
| RD3-team04 =  Guo Hua
| RD3-score04 = 3

| RD4-seed01 = 
| RD4-team01 =

References

1996 in snooker
Sport in Pakistan